In fluid dynamics, the reduced viscosity of a polymer is the ratio of the relative viscosity increment to the mass concentration of the species of interest. It has units of volume per unit mass. 

The reduced viscosity is given by: 

 

See also
Relative viscosity 
Viscosity
Intrinsic viscosity
Huggins equation

References

Viscosity